Zuloaga is a Basque surname. Notable people with the surname include:

Daniel Zuloaga Boneta (1852-1921), a Spanish painter and ceramist, an uncle of Ignacio
Elisa Elvira Zuloaga (1900–1980), Venezuelan painter and engraver
Eusebio Zuloaga González (1808-1898), a Spanish gunsmith and promoter of the art of damascening and father of Daniel
Félix María Zuloaga Trillo (1803-1898), Conservative president of Mexico during the Reform War
Ignacio Zuloaga y Zabaleta (1870-1945), a Spanish painter
Matías Zuloaga (born 1997), Argentine cross-country skier
Ricardo Zuloaga (1867-1932), Venezuelan businessman
Victoria Zuloaga (born 1988), Argentine field hockey player

See also
Óscar Machado Zuloaga International Airport

Basque-language surnames